Austin Kafentzis (born April 10, 1996) is an American football linebacker who is currently a free agent. He played college football with the BYU Cougars.

High school
As a Freshman at Jordan High School in Sandy, Utah, he led the Jordan Beetdiggers to the 5A state semifinals, where he broke his collarbone.  He threw for 3,199 yards on the season, ran for 1,377 yards and was responsible for 45 touchdowns that season. His total offensive yardage placed him at fifth all-time in Utah state history. Kafentzis and his teammates were invited to ESPN's 7-on-7 tournament, an honor no other Utah school had ever accomplished.  As a freshman Kafentzis was a first-team all-state player and was named the MaxPreps High School Freshman of the Year. Sports Illustrated named him as a "Future Game Changer."

As a sophomore Kafentzis led the Beetdiggers to a 5A state title with 3,018 yards passing and 32 touchdowns, while rushing for 1,884 yards and 26 touchdowns. Kafentzis was named the MaxPreps National Sophomore of the Year and the 2012 and 2014 Utah Gatorade Player of the Year.

Kafentzis is the only four-time 1st team unanimous all-state selection at any position in the history of Utah high school football. There have been two three time 1st team selections in the history of Utah high school football.

In addition to his football accomplishments, Kafentzis also holds the Utah Class 5A records for the Javelin throw (217' 9 1/2"), breaking the previous records as a high school freshman. Kafentzis is also a three-time state champ in the javelin (freshman, sophomore, and junior, did not compete as a senior to enroll early at Wisconsin for football).

High School stats

Recruiting
At the conclusion of his Freshman season Kafentzis was offered a scholarship to play for BYU. By the end of his sophomore season he held offers from BYU, Utah State, Utah, Hawaii, and Wisconsin.  He gave a verbal commitment to play football at Wisconsin on June 18, 2013.

Collegiate career

Kafentzis graduated early from Jordan and enrolled in the spring semester at University of Wisconsin in January 2015. However, following spring training Kafenzis announced he would be transferring from the university. On June 10 it was announced that Kafentzis had enrolled at the  University of Nevada. Due to transfer rules Kafentzis was not eligible to play for the 2015 season, however he will have four years of eligibility remaining.

Records

High school

Kafentzis owns 20 Utah state football records.

Career records
Total Offense (20,121)
Rushing Yards (6,942)
Rushing Touchdowns (103)
Touchdowns (scored by rushing, receiving and all returns) (118)
Carries (992)
100-yard Games (38)
Passing Yards (13,079)
TD passes (115)
Pass Attempts (1,453)
Pass Completions (821)
TDs Responsible For (218; 103 rush, 115 pass )
Points Scored in a career (618)
Total yards per game in a season (475.58)
200 yard rushing games in a career (10)
Most consecutive 100 yard rushing games (18) 2013 and 2014 seasons
Wins as a QB (38)

Single-game records
Total Offense - 694 (10/15/2014 vs. Brighton)
Touchdown Passes - 8 (9/21/12 vs. Copper Hills, tied with Alex Hart)
Single-game TDs responsible for - 10 (4 rush, 6 pass; 10/15/14 vs. Brighton, tied with Adam Boelter and Gene Livingston)
Most TD's in a quarter (5), also national record

References

External links

High School player profile

1996 births
Living people
American people of Greek descent
People from Sandy, Utah
American football quarterbacks